Several concepts from mathematics and physics are named after the French mathematician Joseph Liouville.

Euler–Liouville equation
Liouville–Arnold theorem
Liouville–Bratu–Gelfand equation
Liouville–Green method
Liouville's equation
Liouville's formula
Liouville function
Liouville dynamical system
Liouville field theory
Liouville gravity
Liouville integrability
Liouville measure
Liouville number
Liouville one-form
Liouville operator
Liouville space
Liouville surface
Liouville–Neumann series
Liouvillian function
Riemann–Liouville integral
Quantum Liouville equation
Sturm–Liouville theory

Liouville's theorem 
Liouville's theorem (complex analysis)
Liouville's theorem (harmonic functions)
Liouville's theorem (conformal mappings)
Liouville's theorem (differential algebra)
Liouville's theorem (diophantine approximation)
Liouville's theorem (Hamiltonian)

Lioville, Joseph